Jiang Huachen (born February 3, 1982 in Shandong) is a Chinese Greco-Roman wrestler who competed at the 2008 Summer Olympics. Prior to that, his personal best performance was coming first at the  2006 National Championships - 96 kg Greco-Roman class.

See also
China at the 2008 Summer Olympics for more details

References

External links
 2008 Team China profile
 
 
 

1982 births
Living people
Olympic wrestlers of China
Chinese male sport wrestlers
Sportspeople from Shandong
Wrestlers at the 2008 Summer Olympics
Wrestlers at the 2002 Asian Games
Wrestlers at the 2006 Asian Games
Asian Games competitors for China
21st-century Chinese people